Robert Matthew or Mathew may refer to:

 Robert Matthew, Scottish architect
 Robert Mathew, British barrister

See also
Robert Matthew-Walker

Robert Matthews (disambiguation)
Robert Mathews (disambiguation)